= Rudolf I of Habsburg =

Rudolf I of Habsburg may refer to:

- Rudolf of Altenburg (died 1063/4), first Rudolf of the House of Habsburg
- Rudolf I of Germany (died 1291), first king of the House of Habsburg
